The Misfit was an ATV sitcom series starring Ronald Fraser, Patrick Newell and Simon Ward. It was written by Roy Clarke and was broadcast from 1970 to 1971 on ITV.

Premise
Basil Allenby-Johnson ("Badger" for short) returned from a colonial life in Malaya to an England he no longer recognized. Each episode explored Badger's response to a different aspect of modern life in a Britain which had just emerged from the Swinging Sixties.

Cast
 Basil "Badger" Allenby-Johnson – Ronald Fraser 
 Stanley (his brother) – Patrick Newell
 Ted (his son) – Simon Ward  
 Alicia (his daughter-in-law) – Susan Carpenter

Awards
The 1970 Writers Guild Award for the best writer of a British TV series went to Roy Clarke for this series.

Notes
The character of Badger originated a couple of years earlier in an episode of the BBC drama The Troubleshooters, also written by Clarke.

Ronald Fraser said of the character "He epitomises all that was great about the Edwardian gentleman. Honest as the day is long. Loyal, faithful, loving people whatever their colour or creed, and loved by them. And unable to understand the Permissive Society. I'm absolutely in sympathy with him, except that I'm not quite so square." 

Due to the standard practise of wiping at the time which resulted in the loss of many TV programs, the master tapes of ten episodes from this series were wiped and only survive as 16mm monochrome telerecordings. Only the following episodes 'On Being British', 'On Superior Persons' and 'Of Europe and Foreigners and Things''' survive on colour videotape. 

 Episodes 
Series 1 (1970)

Series 2 (1971)

External links
 The Misfit'' at British TV Resources
 The Misfit at British Comedy Guide

References 

ITV sitcoms
1970s British sitcoms
1970 British television series debuts
1971 British television series endings